The 1991 Speedway World Pairs Championship was the twenty-second FIM Speedway World Pairs Championship, held on 20 July 1991. The final took place in Poznań, Poland. The championship was won by Denmark (28 points) who beat Sweden (24 points) and Norway (19 points).

World final
  Poznań, Olimpia Poznań Stadium

See also
 1991 Individual Speedway World Championship
 1991 Speedway World Team Cup
 motorcycle speedway
 1991 in sports

References

1991
World Pairs
Speedway World Pairs